Cajasol could refer to:

 Cajasol Sevilla, a Spanish professional basketball team in Liga ACB.
 One of the four banks that merged to form Banca Civica